Bad Säckingen (High Alemannic: Bad Säckinge) is a rural town in the administrative district of Waldshut in the state of Baden-Württemberg in Germany. It is famous as the "Trumpeteer's City" because of the book Der Trompeter von Säckingen ("The Trumpeter of Säckingen"), a famous 19th-century novel by German author Joseph Victor von Scheffel.

Geography 
Bad Säckingen is located in the very southwest of Germany next to the Swiss border on the river Rhine. The city lies on the southern edge of the Black Forest area.

Nearby places
Close (<15 km): Wallbach, Wehr (Baden), Murg am Hochrhein, Laufenburg (Baden), Stein AG, Rheinfelden (Schweiz), Rheinfelden (Baden), Rickenbach (Hotzenwald)
Further away (>15 km): Waldshut-Tiengen, Schopfheim, Lörrach, Basel, Brugg AG, Aarau AG, Zürich, Schaffhausen SH, St. Blasien, Todtmoos, Freiburg i.Br., Konstanz.

History 
The history of the city dates back to the early 6th Century, when Saint Fridolin founded Säckingen Abbey and a church. Around 1200 most of the city was destroyed in a huge fire. Afterwards, construction began in the middle of the town on a Gothic cathedral, called the Fridolinsmünster, which can still be visited today.

In the closing stages of the 1672–1678 Franco-Dutch War, the town was severely damaged by French soldiers commanded by the Comte de Choiseul, following their victory over an Imperial force at Rheinfelden on 7 July 1678.

Transport

 Holzbrücke Bad Säckingen
 Bad Säckingen station

People
 Joseph Victor von Scheffel, (1826-1886), author of the book "Der Trompeter von Säckingen"
 Wibrandis Rosenblatt (1504-1564), was successively the wife of three important reformers Oecolampadius, Capito and Bucer
 Karl Agricola (1779-1852), painter and engraver

 Axel Neumann (born 1966), actor
 Baki Davrak (born 1971), actor
 Stefanie Böhler (born 1981), cross-country skier

Twin towns
 Sanary-sur-Mer, France (1973)
 Purkersdorf, Austria (1973)
 Nagai, Yamagata, Japan (1983)
 Santeramo, Italy (1983)
 Näfels, Switzerland (1988)

References

External links

  Bad Säckingen:History and images

Spa towns in Germany
Waldshut (district)
Germany–Switzerland border crossings
Baden